Joseph Harrison may refer to:
 Joseph Harrison (horticulturalist) (1798–1856), British horticulturalist and editor of horticultural periodicals
 Joseph Harrison (poet) (born 1957), American poet and editor
 Joseph Harrison Jr., partner in the American steam locomotive manufacturing firm Eastwick and Harrison
 Joseph A. Harrison (1883–1964), Moravian pastor
 Joseph Harrison, a fictional character in The Adventure of the Naval Treaty, a Sherlock Holmes story by Sir Arthur Conan Doyle

See also
 Joe Harrison (disambiguation)